Eilean Shona is a tidal island in Loch Moidart, Scotland. The modern name may be from the Old Norse for "sea island".

History 

In 1851 there were reports of evacuations and emigrations of 37 families from the island and the nearby settlement of Dorlinn in the wake of potato blight. In 1856 the sale price of the island was £6,500. Until the middle of the 18th century, Eilean Shona was populated with a number of crofters.

The main house was a small hunting lodge owned, in the middle of the 19th century, by a seafaring Captain Swinburne. He collected numerous types of pine on his travels and established what became one of the most diverse pinetums in Europe. At the end of the 19th century Edinburgh architect Robert Lorimer was commissioned by the island's owner, a Mr Thompson, to remodel the main house, doubling its size.

It was leased to writer J. M. Barrie in the 1920s, who used it as a summer holiday retreat for himself, his foster sons Michael and Nicholas Llewelyn Davies, and a few of their friends.  It was here that he wrote a screenplay for the 1924 film adaptation of Peter Pan.

In the 1930s Eilean Shona was given to Lady Howard De Walden as a wedding present by her future husband. During this period numerous improvements to the island, particularly to the grounds and gardens, were made at the beginning of the 20th century by the De Walden family.

Mr and Mrs Digby Vane bought the island in 1962 and sold it to the Stead family in 1982. The island has belonged to the Devereux-Branson family since 1995. Vanessa Branson and Robert Devereux purchased the island in 1995 for around £1.3 million. In May 2020, Branson opened her holiday home to rentals by the public, including the 11 bedroom main house ("remodelled in the 1890s by Sir Robert Lorimer") and seven Hebridean croft cottages.

The current usually resident population is 2, down from 9 in 2001. 
 
Other isles in the loch include Riska Island, Eilean an Fheidh and Eilean Tioram. Eilean Shona House overlooks Riska and Castle Tioram. The old Schoolhouse (on the North Shore track between Sawmill and Baramore) is in an isolated position, some two miles down a track, reputedly because when it was built  in the nineteenth century the wife of the island's owner did not wish to be disturbed by children.

The peninsula of Shona Beag is accessible from the mainland by a short causeway at low tide (grid reference NM 669 739). Eilean Shona is one of 43 tidal islands that can be walked to from the mainland of Great Britain and one of 17 that can be walked to from the Scottish mainland.

References

External links 

 Eilean Shona page

Tidal islands of Scotland
Islands of Highland (council area)